Pueblo Libre District is one of ten districts of the province Huaylas in Peru.

Ethnic groups 
The people in the district are mainly indigenous citizens of Quechua descent. Quechua is the language that the majority of the population (89.90%) learned to speak in childhood, while 9.83% of the residents started speaking using the Spanish language (2007 Peru Census).

References

Districts of the Huaylas Province
Districts of the Ancash Region